Madlib Invazion is the debut EP by Oxnard based hip hop producer and rapper Madlib. This EP contains production from Madlib and features vocals from fellow Lootpack member Wildchild and label mate MED among others.

Track listing
All songs are produced and mixed by Madlib.

External links
 Madlib Invazion on Stones Throw's website.

2000 debut EPs
Madlib albums